Eli "Rezne" Wong (born May 12, 1991) is a national-level swimmer from the Northern Mariana Islands. He swam at 3 World Championships (2007, 2009 and 2011), and is to also swim at the 2013 World Championships.
He attended and swam for the USA's University of Hawaii (2009-2013).

References

1991 births
Living people
Northern Mariana Islands sportsmen
Hawaii Rainbow Warriors swimmers